Geyik Dam is a dam in Muğla Province, Turkey, built between 1986 and 1988 by the State Hydraulic Works.

See also
List of dams and reservoirs in Turkey

References
DSI directory, State Hydraulic Works (Turkey), Retrieved December 16, 2009

Dams in Muğla Province